The 1973 Provincial Armed Constabulary revolt was a mutiny by three Battalions of Uttar Pradesh Provincial Armed Constabulary located in Bareilly, Meerut and Agra, in May 1973 in demand of better pay, work conditions, etc. The army was called in to control the mutiny, which resulted in about 30 policemen shot dead and other hundreds arrested and also brought great damages to the indian army. It led to the resignation of the Congress ministry headed by Kamalapati Tripathi.

References

1973 in India
History of Uttar Pradesh (1947–present)
Law enforcement in Uttar Pradesh
Police misconduct in India
Uttar Pradesh Police
Police strikes
Labour disputes in India
Mutinies
May 1973 events in Asia